Hans Petter Ødegård (born 16 June 1959) is a Norwegian former cyclist. He competed in the individual road race and the team time trial events at the 1984 Summer Olympics.

References

External links
 

1959 births
Living people
Norwegian male cyclists
Olympic cyclists of Norway
Cyclists at the 1984 Summer Olympics
Cyclists from Oslo